Laure Favre-Kahn (born 24 October 1976) is a French classical pianist.

Biography 
Born in Arles, it was her father, an amateur pianist, who introduced her to the piano at the age of four. She took classes at the  before entering the Conservatoire de Paris in 1991.

She studied in Bruno Rigutto's class and won a first prize in 1993.

References

External links 
 Official website
 Laure Favre-Kahn sur Pianobleu.com
 Laure Favre-Kahn on France Musique
 Frédéric chopin- 2eme impromptu (YouTube)

1976 births
Living people
People from Arles
Conservatoire de Paris alumni
21st-century French women classical pianists